The 2008 Bin Salman mosque bombing was on 2 May 2008 at the Bin Salman Mosque in Sa'dah, Yemen, which killed 15 and injured 55. Local officials believed the bomb was hidden in a car or a motorcycle.

Some witnesses said the target may have been the mosque's imam, or prayer leader, an army officer who adheres to the Salafi school of Sunni Islam. Witnesses said he was not hurt. Military personnel are among those who usually pray at the Bin Salman mosque, which like others in Yemen caters for both the majority Sunni community and Shia Zaidis.

See also
 List of terrorist incidents, 2008

References

2008 murders in Yemen
Explosions in 2008
Terrorist incidents in Yemen in 2008
Mass murder in 2008
2008 in Yemen
Car and truck bombings in Yemen
Houthi insurgency in Yemen
Attacks on Shiite mosques
May 2008 events in Asia